Natronincola histidinovorans is a moderately haloalkaliphilic, obligately anaerobic, and acetogenic bacterium from the genus of Natronincola which has been isolated from soda deposits from the Lake Magadi.

References

Clostridiaceae
Bacteria described in 1999
Bacillota